Tuishevo (Tuyış) is a rural locality (a village) in Baimovsky Selsoviet, Abzelilovsky District, Bashkortostan, Russia. The population was 475 as of 2010. There are 6 streets.

Geography 
Tuishevo is located 65 km northeast of Askarovo (the district's administrative centre) by road. Baimovo is the nearest rural locality.

References 

Rural localities in Abzelilovsky District